Type 1 tumor necrosis factor receptor shedding aminopeptidase regulator, also known as endoplasmic reticulum aminopeptidase 1 (ARTS-1), is a protein which in humans is encoded by the ARTS-1 gene.

Endoplasmic reticulum amino peptidase 1 is active in the endoplasmic reticulum, which is involved in protein processing and transport. This protein is an aminopeptidase, which is an enzyme that cleaves peptides at the N-terminal into smaller fragments called amino acids.

Nomenclature 
ARTS1 is also known as: 
 ER aminopeptidase 1 (ERAP1) the name accepted by the Hugo Gene Nomenclature Committee
 ER aminopeptidase associated with antigen processing (ERAAP) in mice 
 Adipocyte-derived leucine aminopeptidase (ALAP)
 Puromycin-insensitive leucine aminopeptidase (PILS-AP)

Function 

ERAP1 has two major functions in the immune system:

First, ERAP1 cleaves several proteins called cytokine receptors on the surface of cells. Cleaving these receptors reduces their ability to transmit chemical signals into the cell, which affects the process of inflammation.
Second, ERAP1 trims peptides within the endoplasmic reticulum so that they can be loaded onto major histocompatibility complex (MHC) class I. These peptides are attached to MHC class I in the endoplasmic reticulum and exported to the cell surface, where they are displayed to the immune system. If the immune system recognizes the peptides as foreign (such as viral or bacterial peptides), it responds by triggering the infected cell to self-destruct.

ARTS-1  is a member of the M1 family of zinc metallopeptidases which acts as an aminopeptidase that degrades oligopeptides by cleavage starting at the amino terminus.  One of the functions of aminopeptidases is to degrade potentially toxic peptides in the cytosol.

ARTS-1 is a transmembrane protein that is localized to the endoplasmic reticulum.  It has been implicated in the following functions:
 Shedding of various cytokine receptors and decoy receptors
 Trimming of antigenic peptides before binding to MHC class I, affecting antigen presentation to cytotoxic T lymphocytes
Stimulation of phagocytosis upon release by macrophages

Clinical significance 

Aminopeptidases play a role in the metabolism of several peptides that may be involved in blood pressure and the pathogenesis of essential hypertension. Mutations in the ARTS-1 have been linked to an increased risk of ankylosing spondylitis but only in HLA-B27 positive patients.

The protein encoded by this gene is an aminopeptidase involved in trimming HLA class I-binding precursors so that they can be presented on MHC class I molecules. The encoded protein acts as a monomer or as a heterodimer with ERAP2. This protein may also be involved in blood pressure regulation by inactivation of angiotensin II. Three transcript variants encoding two different isoforms have been found for this gene.

References

External links

Further reading